Seo Min-guk (born September 17, 1991) is a South Korean curler from Yangju, Gyeonggi-do, South Korea. As the alternate for Jeong Yeong-seok, he represented South Korea at the 2021 World Men's Curling Championship.

Career
Seo represented South Korea at four Pacific-Asia Junior Curling Championships from 2010 to 2013 with his teammates Kim Jeong-min, Jang Jin-yeong, Kim San and Kim Woorammiroo. After missing the playoffs in 2010, the team won three consecutive silver medals in 2011, 2012 and 2013.

In 2020, Jeong Yeong-seok skipped his Gyeonggi-do Curling Federation team to victory at the 2020 Korean Curling Championships. This earned the team the right to represent South Korea at the 2021 World Men's Curling Championship in Calgary, Alberta. For the championship, the team altered their lineup, bringing Seo in as their alternate. At the Worlds, they finished with a 2–11 record.

Personal life
Seo is a full-time curler.

Teams

References

External links

1991 births
Living people
South Korean male curlers
Curlers from Seoul
People from Yangju
Sportspeople from Gyeonggi Province
21st-century South Korean people